Nicholas Thompson (born 1975) is an American technology journalist and media executive. In February 2021, he became Chief Executive Officer of The Atlantic. Thompson was selected in part for his editorial experience, which includes stints as the editor-in-chief of Wired and as the editor of Newyorker.com. He was responsible for instituting digital paywalls at both The New Yorker and Wired; at Wired, digital subscriptions increased almost 300 percent in the paywall's first year. While at The New Yorker, Thompson co-founded Atavist, which sold to Automattic in 2018, and in 2009, he published his first book, The Hawk and the Dove: Paul Nitze, George Kennan, and the History of the Cold War, a biography of George Kennan and Thompson's maternal grandfather, Paul Nitze. Thompson's assorted writing includes features on Facebook's scandals, his own friendship with Stalin's daughter, an unidentified hiker, and his marathon running.

In addition to his work at The Atlantic, Thompson is a contributor for CBS News and regularly appears on CBS This Morning and CBSN. In 2021, he set the American record in the 50k for men aged 40–45.

Early life and education 
Thompson grew up in Chestnut Hill, Massachusetts and went to high school at Phillips Academy, Andover. He then attended Stanford University, where he wrote for the Stanford Daily and founded a student newspaper, The Thinker. He graduated Phi Beta Kappa in 1997 with honors and with degrees in Earth Systems, Political Science, and Economics, and in 1996, he was awarded a Harry S. Truman Scholarship. Upon receiving the scholarship, Thompson stressed his interest in "help[ing] create links between environmentalists and businesspeople."

Career 
After college, Thompson briefly worked at CBS as an associate producer before being fired on his first day, as someone believed he was too inexperienced. Without other plans, he traveled to Africa, where he was kidnapped in Morocco by drug dealers “immediately upon landing.” The daylong experience led Thompson to publish his first professional story, a piece in The Washington Post titled "Continental Drift."

When he came back to the U.S., Thompson worked as a freelance journalist and as a street musician in New York City, frequently performing on the 14th Street L train platform at Sixth Avenue. He was then hired at Penguin Computing, a Linux hardware company in San Francisco, but he made the transition back to journalism when he was hired as an editor of the Washington Monthly in 1999. During two years Thompson worked at Washington Monthly under Charles Peters and Paul Glastris, his most prominent story was a piece that exposed fraud in the U.S. News & World Report college rankings. Following another stint as a freelance reporter in Africa, he was hired as a senior editor at Legal Affairs.

In 2005, he was about to start law school at NYU when he instead joined Wired as a senior editor. During that time, he assigned and edited the feature story, "The Great Escape," which was the basis for the Oscar-winning film Argo. He also edited "Vanish" by writer Evan Ratliff, an interactive digital manhunt in which Ratliff tried to disappear with no digital record and challenged readers to track him down, all in an attempt to figure out how difficult it would be to "vanish in the digital age." The winner would walk away with $5000 and a photo in Wired, and Thompson's job was to slowly parcel out information on Ratliff. Afterwards, Thompson and Ratliff, along with Jefferson Rabb, co-founded Atavist, a multimedia magazine and software company. In 2018, Thompson, Rabb, and Ratliff sold Atavist to Automattic, the parent company of WordPress.

In 2010, Thompson was hired as a senior editor at The New Yorker. From 2012 to 2017, Thompson served as the editor of Newyorker.com, where he oversaw and managed the magazine's website. In that time, the number of monthly readers increased seven-fold. He also led the redesign and re-platforming of the site, the launch of The New Yorker Today app, and the introduction of a metered paywall. "What we're trying to do is make a website that is to the Internet what the magazine is to all other magazines," Thompson told Politico at the time of the website's relaunch in 2014. By the time the metered paywall was introduced months later, new subscription sign-ups were 85 percent higher than they had been the previous January. Thompson also wrote for the magazine, most notably a piece on his long friendship with Joseph Stalin's daughter.

In 2017, Thompson returned to Wired as its fifth editor-in-chief. “Nick’s return to Wired, combined with his impeccable journalistic skills, will give the Wired team a tremendous advantage in covering the world of technology,” Condé Nast's Anna Wintour said at the time of the announcement. Under his leadership, Wired launched a successful paywall, won the National Magazine Award for design and photography and was nominated for general excellence. Thompson took an evolved approach to the magazine's editorial mission, as Wired was once an optimistic advocate for the tech industry. “The job isn’t to champion, the job is to be as smart as you can be about [tech companies] and praise them when they do things that are right and hold them to account when they do things that are wrong,” he said. “The role of Wired has shifted, and it’s shifted in a way that’s a little complicated for our audience.”

In October 2018, Wired celebrated its 25th anniversary with a four-day festival and summit in San Francisco, as well as a VIP dinner hosted by Thompson and Anna Wintour.

As editor-in-chief, Thompson continued writing and reporting. In February 2018, he co-wrote Wireds cover story "Inside the Two Years that Shook Facebook—and the World," an 11,000-word investigation based on reporting with more than fifty current and former Facebook employees. Fortune described the piece as "a stellar example of the sort of long-form journalism that no summaries or clickbait teases or listicles can replace, the kind of substantive analysis and storytelling that make democracy and capitalism function.” He has also authored features about Instagram's machine learning, the rising tensions between the US and China over artificial intelligence, how technology helped him run a faster marathon at age 43, and his personal relationship to running. In 2020, Thompson authored a viral story about an unidentified, deceased hiker known to others as "Mostly Harmless." Mostly Harmless was identified in January 2021, and Thompson penned a follow-up piece in the aftermath.

Thompson is also the author of a book, The Hawk and the Dove: Paul Nitze, George Kennan, and the History of the Cold War, which was published in 2009. It tells the story of the Cold War through the relationship and rivalry of Kennan, the author of the Long Telegram, and Nitze, one of America's top arms negotiators, who was also Thompson's grandfather. The Washington Post called the book “brilliant” and The New York Times described it as “brimming with fascinating revelations.”

In 2018, he was named one of LinkedIn's top voices alongside Richard Branson, Melinda Gates, and Justin Trudeau.

Running
On April 14, 2021, Thompson set the American record in the 50k for the 45-49 age group after finishing the race in 3:04:36. He credited his success partly to variations in stimulus and to his new position at The Atlantic, noting that "a key part of aging successfully is doing something new."

Bibliography

Books

Essays and reporting
 
 
 
 Thompson, Nicholas (August 14, 2017). "Instagram's Kevin Systrom Wants to Clean Up the Internet." Wired.
Thompson, Nicholas (November 2, 2018). "An Aging Marathoner Tries to Run Fast After 40." Wired.
 Thompson, Nicholas (October 23, 2018). "The AI Cold War That Threatens Us All." Wired.
 Thompson, Nicholas (April 20, 2020). "To Run My Best Marathon at Age 44, I Had to Outrun My Past." Wired.
Thompson, Nicholas (December 2, 2020). "A Nameless Hiker and the Case the Internet Can’t Crack." Wired.
Thompson, Nicholas (January 12, 2021). "The Unsettling Truth About the ‘Mostly Harmless’ Hiker." Wired.

References

External links
Nicholas Thompson's Personal Website
 

Living people
Wired (magazine) people
The New Yorker editors
American technology writers
American reporters and correspondents
Stanford University alumni
Phillips Academy alumni
1975 births